The following properties are listed on the National Register of Historic Places in Lawrence, Massachusetts.

This is intended to be a complete list of the properties and districts on the National Register of Historic Places in Lawrence, Massachusetts, United States. The locations of National Register properties and districts for which the latitude and longitude coordinates are included below, may be seen in a Google map.

Essex County, of which Lawrence is a part, is the location of 461 properties and districts listed on the National Register. Lawrence itself is the location of 24 of these properties and districts.

Current listings

|}

See also

List of National Historic Landmarks in Massachusetts
National Register of Historic Places listings in Essex County, Massachusetts
National Register of Historic Places listings in Massachusetts

References

Lawrence
 
Lawrence, Massachusetts